Brock, known as  in Japan, is a fictional character in the Pokémon franchise owned by Nintendo. In the Pokémon video games, he is the Gym Leader of Pewter City and mainly uses Rock-type Pokémon. In the anime series, Ash comes across a man that is later revealed to be Brock's father. He explains that Brock wanted to become a Pokémon Master but due to his father leaving, Brock had to take care of his many, many siblings and could not leave. This is why he became a gym leader, to stay close to his family. His father comes back and states that he will take care of the family. Brock left his position as a Gym Leader to travel alongside Ash Ketchum and became a revered Pokémon breeder. He later cultivates his skill in medicine, and goes to Pewter City in order to train and become a Pokémon doctor. He has also appeared in several Pokémon manga series, including Pokémon Adventures and the Ash & Pikachu manga.

Characteristics

Brock is considered the most mature, wise, and level-headed of the main characters. He often acts as an older brother and caretaker to the other characters and a voice of reason in disputes. He will usually place others before him and will help and support his friends even against his better judgment or at his own expense. While he is not shown to battle often, he can understand the situations and strategies in any Pokémon battle, and often explains them to the other characters (and to the viewer), probably because he was once a Gym Leader. Brock always carries books and maps with him, and thus is usually the character who knows where the group is headed and what they can do when they get there, though in Advanced Generation, this role was mostly taken over by the PokéNav. He also carries a lot of other supplies, such as potions and cookware, as well as practical tools like a brush and pocket knife. He is a domestic, and grooms not only his Pokémon but also those of his friends with whom he travels. He handles all the cooking and cleaning for his friends.

Brock is the tallest of the main characters, and the closest to looking like an adult. Next to actual adult characters, however, it is clear that he is still a teenager. Brock’s outfits in the anime mainly consist of the colors orange, green, and brown, with blue shoes. His goals have played a passive role in his character's activity and development. Unlike other characters, who aspire to achieve and excel in competitive fields like Pokémon Training and Pokémon Contests, his aim to become a great Pokémon breeder is a quiet one and thus does not get showcased frequently. 

His other goal is to find a girlfriend as seen when he tries to ask Nurse Joy or Officer Jenny out or any other pretty girl he sees. There is also a running gag in the anime where Brock comes on too strong to a girl he finds pretty and Misty will pull his ear, dragging Brock away and making a comment in the process. Following Misty's departure as a main character at the end of the fifth season, Max assumes this role starting in season seven shortly after witnessing her briefly reprise her duty in this during a guest appearance. In season nine, Brock's Bonsly also begins attacking him for his flirtatious habits, and starting in season 10 until season 13, Brock's Croagunk assumes this role by stunning him with Poison Jab during his flirtation and then dragging him away. 

Brock's most notable feature is that his eyes naturally appear closed. He also has tanned skin, notably darker than the skin of any other major character in the series.

He has been referred to by the full name Brock Harrison since 2003, including his voice actor Eric Stuart in a 2006 interview with K-Zone Australia.

Relationships
Brock often acts like a father figure to his friends that he travels with, giving them advice and keeping them out of trouble and well taken care of while they're away from their homes. He guides Ash and makes sure that he does not get into any danger. The two of them very rarely fight and get along quite well. They often team up with one another to beat Team Rocket and other opponents. Ash and Brock are very close and are rarely seen apart from each other, much like Ash and Pikachu.

Appearances

In the video games

Brock is the Gym Leader of Pewter City in the fictional region of Kanto. He specializes in Rock-type Pokémon, and the player may battle him in Pokémon Red, Blue, Yellow, Gold, Silver, Crystal, FireRed, LeafGreen, HeartGold, SoulSilver, Let's Go, Pikachu!, Let's Go, Eevee!, Pokémon Stadium, and Pokémon Stadium 2. It has been confirmed that Brock, along with Misty and Blue, return in Pokémon Black 2 and White 2 as tournament opponents.. Alongside his Onix, Brock also appears as a sync pair in Pokémon Masters EX near the beginning of the game.

In the anime

In the Pokémon anime, Brock aspires to be the greatest Pokémon breeder, and gives up his title of Gym Leader after Ash Ketchum wins his first Indigo League Gym Badge from him. He is first seen taking care of his nine siblings. After Ash loses to Brock the first time, a stranger offers to help make his Pikachu stronger. Pikachu (after being hooked up to a local hydro-power station) becomes stronger and manages to defeat Geodude, but Onix remains too strong. Onix has Pikachu in a body bind; however, Pikachu's previous electric attack ravaged the gym, which set off the sprinklers, weakening Onix. Ash declines the badge on the grounds that he unfairly beat Brock, but Brock later catches up to him and presents to him the badge, saying that he wants Ash to fulfill his dream of becoming the best. The stranger that first helped Ash reveals himself to be Brock's father, Flint. Brock is now free to train himself, and joins Ash and Misty on their journey in Kanto. In the original Japanese version of the anime, Flint's wife was described to have joined him in abandoning their children sometime before these events occurred. In the American version, this was changed to Flint telling Ash that Brock's mother died. However, Brock's mother appears alive and well in later episodes.

Since then, he travels with Ash and Misty on their many adventures. In the Orange Islands series, he leaves the team to join Professor Felina Ivy and was replaced by Tracey Sketchit, but mysteriously returns to Pallet Town when Ash wins the Orange League Championship. Rejoining Ash and Misty, Brock travels to Johto, where he continues to help Ash and Misty. Upon the conclusion of the Silver Conference, the three part ways, and Brock heads back to Pewter City. There (in an episode of Pokémon Chronicles) he discovers his estranged mother Lola (Mizuho in the original), who, because she is a Water Pokémon Trainer, has ruined the reputation of the Gym he defended so dearly by turning it into a Water-type gym. By defeating his mother, he restores the Gym's reputation. He then leaves all his Pokémon (except Forretress) to his younger brother Forrest before departing for the Hoenn region, where he catches up with Ash and his two new friends, May and Max. The group travels across Hoenn and then returns to Kanto to participate in the Battle Frontier. The group then parted ways once again until Brock met up with Ash in Sinnoh in the next season. Brock also appears in a composed arc of at least two episodes of the Sun & Moon series. Brock later appears in two more episodes of the Sun & Moon series when he reunites with Ash in Alola. He will make a guest appearance in Pokémon Ultimate Journeys: The Series during the final episodes of Ash's journey as Pokémon master.

During this time, Brock's father, Flint (Munō in the original, who was also Brock's predecessor as Gym Leader), ran off again, and his brother Forrest (Jirō in the original) has taken the role of Gym Leader in Pewter City, as well as the responsibility of caring for his eight younger siblings. Brock is the oldest of ten children, with five brothers and four sisters.

Brock is always well-equipped, and is often the voice of reason when the rest of the team get into an argument. He is also hardworking and is always willing to help others. Coupled with his experiences in taking care of others, Brock prepares food and does most chores for the main characters. Brock is also exceptionally good at making food for Pokémon. Brock shows the typical "clean freak" personality when he sees messiness, which has even prompted him to start cleaning immediately on at least one occasion. Brock parts ways with Ash one final time after the Sinnoh League to go forth and achieve his new goal of becoming a Pokémon doctor.

Voice actors

Critical reception
The book The Japanification of Children's Popular Culture described Brock's portrayal in the anime as a mentor figure, providing an authoritative voice for Ash in the series. It additionally noted him as representing the concept of early maturity in Japanese stories, in his acceptance of a position of independence and his strong interest in women. The book Pikachu's Global Adventure: The Rise and Fall of Pokémon cited him as a heavily popular character in the United States, with boys identifying themselves with the character, expressing a desire to be "friends with characters that are known to be good or considerate friends". The book additionally noted a contrast to other characters in the series, in that Brock is drawn with "thinly drawn eyes and slightly darker skin tone".

References

External links

 Brock's article at Bulbapedia

Male characters in animated series
Television characters introduced in 1997
Animated characters introduced in 1997
Male characters in film
Pokémon characters
Nintendo protagonists
Video game bosses
Video game characters introduced in 1996
Male characters in anime and manga
Male characters in television
Male characters in video games
Teenage characters in musical theatre
Teenage characters in anime and manga
Teenage characters in animated films
Teenage characters in television
Teenage characters in video games
Animated human characters

fr:Personnages de Pokémon#Pierre
pt:Anexo:Lista de personagens de Pokémon (anime)#Companheiros de viagem